Light in the Dark is a 2019 Nigerian drama/thriller feature film by Ekene Som Mekwunye. The film stars some of the biggest names in Nollywood, such as Rita Dominic, Joke Silva, Saidi Balogun, Kiki Omeili, Bimbo Ademoye, and Kalu Ikeagwu.

Plot
The film features a couple, Emeka and Jumoke, who have been married for 11 years and they have a daughter who they love dearly. Jumoke have been trying hard to have another child and hope it would be a boy to appease Emeka’s family. A gang attacks them one night and the gang leader decides to rape Jumoke. This puts a huge strain in their relationship and it gets tougher as a series of events begin to unfold.

Cast and production
The movie stars Rita Dominic, Joke Silva, Kiki Omeili, Kalu Ikeagwu, Bimbo Ademoye, Ngozi Nwosu, Saidi Balogun, Emmanuel 'Mannie' Essien etc. It was directed by Ekene Som Mekwunye and he also produced it with Chidinma Uzodike.

Screenings and reception
It has screened in film festivals in five different continents, including Soo Film Festival, Silicon Valley African Film Festival both in the USA, Brasilia international film festival in Brazil, Nollywood Week film festival in Paris Durban International Film Festival in South Africa, Diorama International Film Festival in India,

It was released in Nigerian and Ghanaian cinemas on the 25th of January 2019. etc. It also got four nominations at the African Movie Academy Awards in 2019. It also won the top prize for best film at the Kaduna International Film Festival in 2020 where Ekene Som Mekwunye was also awarded Best Director. Light In The Dark is currently on Netflix.

References

External links

2010s English-language films
English-language Nigerian films